Marc Wallace Jordan (born March 6, 1948) is an American-born Canadian singer-songwriter, record producer, session musician, and actor. Covering a wide variety of genres, he has written songs for a number of well-known artists, including Diana Ross, Rod Stewart, Cher, Bette Midler, Chicago, and Josh Groban. He was named best producer with Steven MacKinnon at the Juno Awards in 1994 for "Waiting for a Miracle" from Reckless Valentine.  In early 2014, Jordan was named Chair of Slaight Family Music Lab at Norman Jewison's Canadian Film Centre.

Biography
Born in Brooklyn, New York, the son of Canadian singer Charles Jordan, Marc Jordan grew up in a musical household in Toronto after his father returned to Canada. He studied film at Brock University but soon turned to music, coming to public attention as a guitarist for Bobby Vee.

With the Canadian division of CBS Records, Jordan released some singles in 1974, which included "It's a Fine Line", "New York Kids", "Original Sin"). They were not very successful themselves, but they impressed American music producer Gary Katz, and in 1977 Jordan reached a U.S. deal with Warner Bros. Records. This period with Warner spawned the Canadian hit songs "Marina del Rey" and "Survival" from the record Mannequin; a second record produced by Jay Graydon called Blue Desert was released in 1979, and is regarded as a classic of the West Coast Sound of the period.

In the 1980s, Jordan was signed to RCA for two records. Paul De Villiers produced the first, Talking Through Pictures, and Kim Bullard the second, called C.O.W.. In 1988, Jordan sang and co-wrote the theme song to the hit Australian movie Boulevard of Broken Dreams which was nominated for an AFI Award for Best Film. In 1989, he and Jay Gruska received a Genie Award nomination for Best Original Song for "Shadow Dance", a song they wrote for the film Shadow Dancing.

In 1994, Jordan won a Juno Award for "Producer of the Year" (along with co-producer Steven MacKinnon) for "Waiting for a Miracle" from his Reckless Valentine album.

After independently releasing the critically acclaimed recordings Reckless Valentine and Cool Jam Black Earth, he was signed to Blue Note/EMI Canada in 1999, and followed up with two more jazz-oriented CDs, This Is How Men Cry and Make Believe Ballroom.

In 2014 the Canadian Film Centre appointed Jordan as the Musical Director of its Slaight Family Music Lab.

During the summer of 2016, Jordan was performing with singers Murray McLauchlan, Cindy Church and Ian Thomas in the group Lunch At Allen's, in a number of towns and small cities in Ontario, Canada. He is married to fellow singer-songwriter Amy Sky. They live in Toronto and have a cottage in Muskoka with their two children, Ezra and Zoe. Jordan and Sky are both national UNICEF Goodwill Ambassadors for Canada.

Jordan made his acting debut in Michael McGowan's 2010 sports musical Score: A Hockey Musical, where he plays Edgar Gordon, a pacifist father who along with his wife (Olivia Newton-John) have a 17-year-old son who has a talent for hockey.

Jordan's fifteenth and latest studio album, Waiting for the Sun to Rise, will be released on April 21, 2023 through Linus Entertainment. It will be Jordan's first album of original material since On a Perfect Day (2013).

This is How Men Cry
First released in Canada by Blue Note/EMI on October 25, 1999, This is How Men Cry contains six tracks written by Jordan: "This Is How Men Cry," "Charlie Parker Loves Me" (covered by Rod Stewart on his album Human, released February 6, 2001), "Slow Bombing the World," "I Must Have Left My Heart," "Let's Get Lost," and "London in the Rain". There are an additional three covers: Willie Nelson's '"Crazy," Elvis Costello's "Almost Blue," and Mann Curtis's "Let it be Me." The lead track, "This is How Men Cry," is a poem about how men communicate, or more often how they don't.

Personal life
Marc Jordan is married to Amy Sky and they have two children together, a son, Ezra and a daughter, Zoe. Jordan is Jewish. His father was a cantor.

Jordan is a member of the Canadian charity Artists Against Racism.

Discography

Studio albums
 Jordan (1977)
 Mannequin (1978)
 Blue Desert (1979)
 A Hole in the Wall (1983)
 Talking Through Pictures (1987)
 C.O.W. (Conserve Our World) (1990)
 Reckless Valentine (1993)
 Cool Jam Black Earth (1996)
 This Is How Men Cry (1999)
 Make Believe Ballroom (2004)
 Crucifix in Dreamland (2010)
 On a Perfect Day (2013)
 Both Sides (2019)
 He Sang She Sang (2022)
 Waiting for the Sun to Rise (2023)

Live albums
 Live (1980)
 Live: Now and Then (1999)

Compilation albums
 Living in Marina del Rey and Other Stories (2002)
 Norm Amadio and Friends (2009)

Singles

Writing credits
A list of artists who have performed songs written by Jordan include the following:

Alfie Zappacosta – Tears of Hercules
Susan Aglukark
Jim Brickman
Cher
Chicago
Joe Cocker
Holly Cole
Natalie Cole
Shawn Colvin
Renée Geyer
Josh Groban
Molly Johnson
David Hasselhoff
Jeff Healey
Don Johnson
Kansas
Kenny Loggins
The Manhattan Transfer
Amanda Marshall
Iain Matthews
Olivia Newton-John
The Nylons
Robert Priest
Bonnie Raitt
Diana Ross
Runrig
Sawyer Brown
René Shuman
Amy Sky
Rod Stewart
Tiffany
Kim Carnes
Keith Harkin
John Paul Young

References

External links
Official site
Lunch at Allen's Official Site
Featured Member page (SOCAN)

 

1947 births
American emigrants to Canada
Brock University alumni
Canadian country singer-songwriters
Canadian pop singers
Canadian jazz singers
Jack Richardson Producer of the Year Award winners
Living people
Musicians from Toronto
21st-century Canadian guitarists
20th-century African-American male singers
Canadian jazz guitarists
Canadian male guitarists
Canadian people of American-Jewish descent
American people of Jewish descent
Canadian male singer-songwriters
Blue Note Records artists
CBS Records artists
RCA Records artists
Warner Records artists
Jewish Canadian musicians
21st-century Canadian male singers